The Man Who Changed His Name is a mystery play by the British writer Edgar Wallace, which was first staged in 1928. A young woman begins to suspect that her wealthy, respectable husband may be an escaped Canadian murderer.

Its initial run lasted for 77 performances at the Apollo Theatre in the West End. The original cast included James Raglan, Hartley Power and Dorothy Dickson.

Adaptions
The play was the basis for three film adaptations. A British silent film The Man Who Changed His Name (1928) directed by A.V. Bramble and a British sound film The Man Who Changed His Name (1934) directed by Henry Edwards. In 1933 Mario Camerini directed an Italian version Giallo starring Assia Noris.

References

Bibliography
 Kabatchnik, Amnon. Blood on the Stage, 1925-1950: Milestone Plays of Crime, Mystery and Detection. Scarecrow Press, 2010.

1928 plays
British plays adapted into films
Plays set in England
Plays by Edgar Wallace
West End plays